Andrew Robert McBrine (born 30 April 1993) is an Irish cricketer. He is a left-handed batsman who bowls right-arm off spin. McBrine is the son of Alexander McBrine and the nephew of James McBrine, both of whom also played cricket for Ireland.

Career
On 26 May 2013, McBrine made his first-class debut for Ireland against Scotland. He made his One Day International debut against Scotland in September 2014.

In May 2018, he was named in a fourteen-man squad for Ireland's first ever Test match, to be played against Pakistan later the same month, but he was not selected to play.

In December 2018, he was one of nineteen players to be awarded a central contract by Cricket Ireland for the 2019 season. In January 2019, he was named in Ireland's squad for their one-off Test against Afghanistan in India. He made his Test debut for Ireland against Afghanistan on 15 March 2019.

In July 2019, he was selected to play for the Belfast Titans in the inaugural edition of the Euro T20 Slam cricket tournament. However, the following month the tournament was cancelled.

In January 2020, he was one of nineteen players to be awarded a central contract from Cricket Ireland, the first year in which all contracts were awarded on a full-time basis. On 10 July 2020, McBrine was named in Ireland's 21-man squad to travel to England to start training behind closed doors for the ODI series against the England cricket team.

On 21 January 2021, in the opening match against Afghanistan, McBrine took his 50th wicket and his first five-wicket haul in ODI cricket. In September 2021, McBrine was named in Ireland's provisional squad for the 2021 ICC Men's T20 World Cup. In February 2022, in the final match of the 2021–22 Oman Quadrangular Series, McBrine played in his 100th international match for Ireland.

In May 2022, in the 2022 Inter-Provincial Cup, McBrine scored his first century in a List A cricket match, with 100 runs against Munster Reds.

References

External links

1993 births
Living people
Irish cricketers
Ireland Test cricketers
Ireland Twenty20 International cricketers
Ireland One Day International cricketers
Cricketers at the 2015 Cricket World Cup
North West Warriors cricketers